Frank Walter (September 11, 1926 – February 11, 2009), born Francis Archibald Wentworth Walter, was an Antiguan artist, sculptor, photographer, composer, writer, and philosopher. Always shy and reserved, he became a recluse in later life so that he could devote himself to the pursuit of art. Walter has achieved posthumous recognition as one of the Caribbean's most significant artists.

Walter produced paintings that dealt with landscape, portraiture, and identity, as well as abstract explorations of nuclear energy and the universe. His portraits, both real and imagined include a ballerina's legs in African Genealogy; Hitler in Dipsomaniac; Walter himself as Christ on the Cross; and Prince Charles and Diana, Princess of Wales as Adam and Eve.

Early life 

Frank Walter was born in Antigua on September 11, 1926. He studied at the Antigua Grammar School where he excelled in Latin, science, and the arts. Impressed by his abilities, Walter's tutors encouraged him to pursue a degree in medicine or law. Walter opted for agriculture.

Walter was raised by elderly family matriarchs and learned from oral histories at a young age that his ancestors included both aristocratic European slave owners and enslaved people of African descent. During Walter's youth, Antigua was a society divided along racial lines, and the reality of mixed-race families created outside of marriage was largely considered private knowledge and often lost through the generations.

In his youth, Walter's education and professional trajectory defied the statistical challenges facing young men of color in 1930s Antigua, and the identity that he constructed was heavily influenced by his awareness of his aristocratic European forebears. Later in life, Walter became tormented by his descent from white slave owners, enslaved women, and illegitimate mixed-race children.

Agricultural career in Antigua 
Walter was the first person of color to break through the race barrier to work in the upper tier of Antigua's agricultural industry. When he was promoted to the role of manager in 1948 at age twenty-two by mentor and Director Sir Alexander Moody-Stuart, Walter became the first to work as an equal among whites in the Antiguan Sugar Syndicate. Sugar was the source of socio-economic power at that point in Antigua's history, and Walter's capabilities earned him the respect of his peers.

Life in Europe 

Walter was offered the opportunity to manage the entire Antiguan Sugar Syndicate in 1953, but he turned down this job to embark on what was intended to be a ten-year industrial Grand Tour of Great Britain and Europe. He was motivated by a desire to engage new technologies to alleviate the poverty of his fellow black countrymen, and wanted to introduce the latest European and British innovation in mining and agriculture to Antigua.

From 1953 to 1961, Walter spent eight years traveling in Europe and the UK struggling with a race-based caste system that relegated him to the menial role of unskilled laborer. During an interview for his first job in London, he proudly stated his role as manager. The employer rebuffed, "We don't have tropical sugar plantations in England", and offered him a job to clean the floors. Walter suffered from poverty resulting from subsistence wages, but continued to pursue his academic interests by studying in Europe's metropolitan libraries. During this period, Walter actively researched his family history and studied various aristocratic family trees. He became obsessed with his heritage, inventing connections to the regents of Britain and Europe—crowning himself as the 7th Prince of the West Indies, Lord of Follies and the Ding-a-Ding Nook. It is interesting to note that Follies and Ding-a-Ding Nook are the names of plantations owned by his white Antiguan ancestors.

The complexities of Walter's mixed-race identity and his frustrations with postcolonial society became increasingly apparent during his eight years in Europe and the UK. However painting, writing, and time spent in the natural world provided solace, and memories of these environments were the subject of much of his art for the next sixty years of his life.

Life in Dominica 
When Walter arrived in Antigua in 1961, the sugar industry was on the brink of collapse. He relocated to the nearby island of Dominica, and applied for and received a land grant from the government. He named his 25-acre agricultural estate Mount Olympus and spent five years clearing the land by hand to create a sustainable and productive acreage. He selectively removed the canopy of bois diable trees to allow sunlight and air for fruit trees and vegetables. Using kilns, he repurposed these cleared materials as charcoal to make a viable local energy source he shared with his neighbors.

During this time, Walter continued to write poetry and prose, and also began to sculpt figures using wood harvested from his estate in a style that was likely inspired by the traditions of the Caribbean Arawak and African Dogon peoples.

Once Mount Olympus was prepared for planting in 1968, the government confiscated it from Walter. He was bereft at his loss and returned to Antigua.

Seclusion in Antigua 
In the late 1960s, Walter became involved in politics and wrote manifestos for the Antigua and Barbuda National Democratic Party. In 1971 he ran and was defeated by his relation, Sir George Walter in Antigua's race for prime minister. He chose to retire from public life and dedicate himself to his art practice in small studios in central St. John's. He worked as a photographer and a painter during this period, selling mostly small Polaroid photographs and tiny paintings of letters of the alphabet and landscape to tourists. No one knew of his larger-scale abstract and figurative paintings, which were done in secret, and stored for a large-scale exhibition that he planned but was never realized.

In 1993, Walter designed and built a house and art studio in the picturesque countryside above Falmouth Harbour where he lived until his death in 2009 in peaceful isolation. He sited the structures to enjoy spectacular views of Sugarloaf Mountain, Monk's Hill, Falmouth Harbour, and the sea, and dwelt in close proximity to nature. Without running water or electricity, Walter grew much of his own food, and lived near his relations who were organic farmers. His home was filled with paintings and sculpture that he made in secrecy and carefully arranged in his house. He was also surrounded by stacks of books on philosophy, law, history, botany, and heraldry. Walter's creative process relied on a multidisciplinary approach and a collection of curio to generate what Walter Benjamin identified in his 1931 essay "Unpacking My Library" as a "dialectical tension between the poles of order and disorder."

While he revered his paintings, Walter's sculptures held a talismanic power for him. They were kept close to him and never for sale to anyone as he believed they connected him to another world. He depicted figures as varied as ancient Arawak people, Antiguan farmers, European royalty, and men from outer space.

He revisited his memories in remarkable detail in painting and writing and explored nature as an avid environmentalist and student of science. Many portraits and landscapes drew upon his memories of travel in Scotland and Europe, and he classified his broad range of paintings as galactic, scientific, heraldic, and abstract.

Artistic legacy 

 5,000 paintings
 1,000 drawings
 2,000 photographs
 600 carved wooden sculptures
 2,000 carved wooden picture frames
 500 handmade wooden toys
 50,000 handwritten and typewritten pages on art, music, poetry, plays, history, philosophy, and political science
 468+ hours of magnetic and cassette audio tapes, recorded in Walter's words and music

In Frank Walter: The Last Universal Man (Radius Books 2017), the Walter family and Barbara Paca worked with a group of distinguished experts with backgrounds in Antiguan politics, philanthropy, international affairs, and neurosurgery to establish the context and interdisciplinary nature of Walter's work. Nina Khrushcheva is responsible for the title, positing that the sheer diversity and depth of Walter's work as visual artist, musician, and philosopher allowed him to attain the humanist ideal of man exemplified in Leonardo da Vinci's Vitruvian Man (c. 1490).

Walter's struggle with his mental health gave him a unique perspective and can be seen as an inextricable part of his creativity and invention. For this reason, comparisons have been made between Frank Walter and mathematician John Nash, who was featured in the 1998 novel A Beautiful Mind by Sylvia Nasar and the 2001 film of the same name directed by Ron Howard.

Walter's art practice has been linked to a diverse group of artists, including Hilma af Klint (1862–1944), Adolf Wölfli (1864–1930), Alfred Wallis (1855–1942), Forrest Bess (1911–1977), and Henry Darger (1892–1973). These artists lived beyond the mainstream, and explored unconventional, fantastic, and deeply personal ideas.

There are few Caribbean parallels to Walter. Guyanese painter Aubrey Williams (1926–1990) shares much in terms of biography. They were both highly educated and enjoyed early careers as successful tropical plantation managers. They were the product of a British colonial heritage, and travelled in the early 1950s to England, where they encountered overt racism. For example, Pablo Picasso reduced Williams to his physical appearance when they met. The famous artist told him that he had a "fine head", and that he would like to paint him one day. According to The New York Times critic Jason Farago, Walter's paintings of Antiguan flora—the insignia of European nobility—and his small abstractions of stars and circles recall the pop art of Robert Indiana.

The Venice Biennale and other selected exhibitions 

"I was incredibly excited by the inaugural Biennale presentation of Antigua and Barbuda, Frank Walter: The Last Universal Man, organized by Barbara Paca. The exhibition features paintings and sculptures alongside furniture, writings and ephemera from Walter's secluded rural home and studio; offering a fascinating and moving glimpse into the life of the prolific and profound multidisciplinary artist." –Thelma Golden, director and chief curator, Studio Museum, NY

One of Walter's most internationally recognized exhibition to date has been Antigua and Barbuda's inaugural National Pavilion as part of La Biennale di Venezia 2017.

The exhibition was refreshingly straightforward: It was conceived to encourage the visitor to inhabit the world of artist Frank Walter, with a generous amount of comfortable seating within interior gallery spaces and an exterior Antiguan garden for quiet reflection. The national pavilion was also intended as a posthumous fulfilment of Walter's expressed desire to open his house and studio as a center for art and dialogue. In keeping with this theme of inclusivity, no entrance fee was charged and the exhibition was thoughtfully designed by Preservation Green LLC of New York to be fully accessible for people with disabilities.

"Of the 85 national pavilions, the most eye-opening is the pavilion of Antigua and Barbuda ... his paintings—of Antiguan flora, the insignia of European nobility, or small abstractions of stars and circles that recall the Pop Art of Robert Indiana—open onto a world much larger than that small dwelling." –Jason Fargo, The New York Times

"One of the most interesting one comes from Antigua. It is that country's first participation. Many missed this one, but a visit is well worth it! The pavilion is small, is also situated on a small island and celebrates the artist Frank Walter who died eight years ago. He lived in extreme poverty, was the child of a slave owner and a slave, a fragmented identity. He travelled extensively in Europe during the fifties and sixties, where he experienced extreme racism. Afterwards he lived in the Antiguan countryside, intensely interested in questions of ecology and agriculture. He was a pioneer. And he painted over 5,000 paintings! An unbelievable body of work, which has not been seen so far. He also wrote poems, worked in nearly all art disciplines. He was the Leonardo da Vinci of Antigua. " –Hans-Ulrich Obrist, Weltkunst

A selection of exhibitions:
 2021 Frank Walter, David Zwirner London, Opening April 15.
 2020 Retrospective, Museum für Moderne Kunst, Frankfurt-am-Main, Germany
 2019 Find Yourself: Carnival and Resistance, (with Timothy Payne, Sir Gerald Price, Joseph Seaton, and Louise Edwards), Antigua and Barbuda National Pavilion, La Biennale di Venezia, Venice, Italy
 2019 Blue Flowers, Robert Heald Gallery, Wellington, New Zealand
 2019 Damn! The Defiant, Fredericks and Freiser Gallery, New York, NY, USA
 2019 Hiding in Plain Sight: Objects Common and Curious, Freeman Art, New York, NY, USA
 2018 Kabinet, Ingleby Gallery, Art Basel Hong Kong, HK
 2018 Frank Walter, solo presentation at the ADAA Art Show, Hirschl & Adler Modern, New York, NY, USA
 2018 Jacob's Ladder, Ingleby Gallery, Edinburgh, Scotland
 2018 Vis-a-Vis, Hirschl & Adler Modern, New York, NY, USA
 2017 and per se and part xvii, with Alexander Calder, Ingleby Gallery, Edinburgh, Scotland
 2017 and per se and part xvi, with Rose Wylie, Ingleby Gallery, Edinburgh, Scotland
 2017 Only Small Paintings, Fortnight Institute, New York, NY, USA
 2017 Flamboyant Trees, Harewood House, Yorkshire, England
 2017 The Last Universal Man, Antigua and Barbuda National Pavilion, La Biennale di Venezia, Venice, Italy
 2017 Outsider Arts Fair, Hirschl & Adler Modern, New York, NY, USA
 2016 Lonely Bird, Hirschl & Adler Modern, New York, NY, USA
 2015 Frank Walter, Ingleby Gallery, Edinburgh, Scotland
 2013 Frank Walter, Douglas Hyde Gallery, Trinity College, Dublin, Ireland
 2013 Frank Walter, Art Basel, Ingleby Gallery, Miami Beach, Miami, Florida, USA
 2013 Songs of Innocence and Experience, (with Forest Bess and Alfred Wallis) Ingleby Gallery, Edinburgh, Scotland
 2013 Frank Walter, solo presentation at the NY Armory Show, Ingleby Gallery, New York, NY, USA

Bibliography 

Books
 Barbara Paca and Susanne Pfeffer (Eds.), (With contributions from Precious Okoyomon, Barbara Paca, Susanne Pfeffer, Cord Riechelmann, Gilane Tawadros, Krista Thompson, and Frank Walter), Frank Walter. Eine Retrospektive, Ausstellungs-Katalog Museum für Moderne Kunst (MMK), Frankfurt am Main 2020, Köln : König, Walther 2020, 
 Barbara Paca (Ed.), (With contributions from The Honourable E. P. Chet Greene Minister of Foreign Affairs, International Trade; Nina Khrushcheva; Luigi di Marzi; The Honourable Daryll Matthew, Commissioner and Minister of Sports, Culture, Festivals, and the Arts, Antigua and Barbuda; and Marco Pianegonda), Find Yourself: Carnival and Resistance, Grafiche Veneziane on the occasion of the 58th International Art Exhibition at the Venice Biennale, 2019, Chapter "Carnival and Frank Walter's Universe". 
 Barbara Paca (Ed.), (With contributions from His Excellency, Sir Rodney Williams, Governor General of Antigua and Barbuda; Nina Khrushcheva; The Rt. Honourable Patricia Scotland, Secretary-General of the Commonwealth; Sir Mark Moody-Stuart; Caitlin Hoffman; Marcus Nakbar Crump; Sir Selvyn Walter; and Kenneth M. Milton), Frank Walter: The Last Universal Man, Radius Books on the occasion of the 57th International Art Exhibition at the Venice Biennale 2017, 
 Barbara Paca, Frank Walter, Art Basel, Miami Beach, Ingleby Gallery 2013, 

Selected press
 Dr. Paget Henry, "On Frank Walter and Walter Parker", The Antigua and Barbuda Review of Books, Vol. 13, Number 1, Fall 2020. 
 "Dr. Barbara Paca consulting curator and coeditor for best exhibition in Europe 2020". Department of Anthropology, University of Maryland, November 2020. https://anth.umd.edu/news/dr.-barbara-paca-consulting-curator-and-coeditor-best-exhibition-europe-2020
Carina Bukuts. "On Our Radar: The Best Exhibitions in Europe Right Now". frieze, October 30, 2020. https://www.frieze.com/article/our-radar-best-exhibitions-europe-right-now-1
 Sarah E. James. "Why Frank Walter Can't Be Categorized". frieze, October 16, 2020. https://www.frieze.com/article/why-frank-walter-cant-be-categorised
"It is impossible not to read Frank Walter’s biography into his art. Born in 1926 in Antigua – a West Indian island whose people were repressed and murdered under British colonial rule from the 1600s, only gaining full independence in 1981 – Walter was a descendent of both plantation owners and slaves." 
 Stephanie Bailey. "Frank Walter's expanding universe". Ocula Magazine, July 10, 2020. 
"It is in these cosmic works, which recall Sun Ra’s conception of space as a site of liberation, that Walter’s approach to life becomes most evident; as a journey in search of worlds capable of accommodating the depth and breadth of far-reaching hopes and visions. He was at once a product of his time and light years ahead of it; an artist who left universes to explore in his wake." https://ocula.com/magazine/reports/in-focus-frank-walters-expanding-universe/
 Alexander Jurgs. "You are no longer afraid". Frankfurter Allgemeine Zeitung, June 29, 2020. https://www.faz.net/aktuell/rhein-main/kultur/rassismus-und-kunst-sie-haben-keine-angst-mehr-16837239.html
 Lisa Zeitz. "The other modern". Weltkunst, No. 173, July 2020. https://www.weltkunst.de/
 Rose-Maria Gropp. "Child of a Caribbean Olympus". Frankfurter Allgemeine Zeitung, June 24, 2020. https://www.faz.net/aktuell/feuilleton/kunst/was-besucher-der-frank-walter-retrospektive-erwartet-16825794.html
 Brigitte Klein. "The Caribbean artist Frank Walter: A retrospective". German TV 1, June 15, 2020.
"His paintings seek a balance between skin color and value. Are echoes of a relentless colonial system—the values of which he could never tragically renounce. 'He is the Caribbean father of modern painting,' says his 91-year old cousin Jules Walter. Frank Walter: The black king from Europe."
 Emily Nill. "Frank Walter: A retrospective". Cuba Paris, May 29, 2020. https://kubaparis.com/frank-walter-eine-retrospektive/
 Catrina Cichosch. "Top five exhibitions". Frankfurt Journal, May 28, 2020.
 Hanno Rauterberg. "The baits are so colorful". Zeit, May 27, 2020. https://www.zeit.de/2020/23/frank-walter-malerei-mmk-frankfurt-postkolonialismus
 Vivien Trommer. "Discovery of the year: The Caribbean artist Frank Walter. The painter whose art survived eleven hurricanes". Welt, May 27, 2020. https://www.welt.de/kultur/article208078381/Entdeckung-des-Jahres-Der-karibische-Kuenstler-Frank-Walter.html
 Alexander Jurgs. "Sad tropics". Der Freitag. May 27, 2020. https://digital.freitag.de/2220/traurige-tropen/
 "Frank Walter: A Retrospective". Artpil. May 25, 2020. https://artpil.com/news/frank-walter-a-retrospective/
 "Announcing Frank Walter: A retrospective". Frankfurter Allgemeine Zeitung, May 23, 2020.
 "Museum of modern art in Frankfurt opens retrospective exhibition of Frank Walter's work". Art Daily, May 22, 2020. https://artdaily.com/news/123626/Museum-f-uuml-r-Moderne-Kunst-in-Frankfurt-opens-retrospective-exhibition-of-Frank-Walter-s-work#.XsGU8qTRbDs
 Perlentaucher, Das Kulturmagazin, May 22, 2020. https://www.perlentaucher.de/efeu/2020-05-16.html
"Catrin Lorch happily returns from the Frankfurt Museum of Modern Art in the SZ , which is devoting the first major retrospective to the Caribbean painter, sculptor and poet Frank Walter. To Lorch the work of the artist and descendants of slaves and German plantation owners, who worked in English mines and at Mannesmann in the Ruhr area before returning to Antigua, appears almost manic. "If you look at the motifs he found in Antigua after his return to Antigua Year 1967 dedicated, now experienced in its entirety, it is surprising how they trace the canon of a bourgeois, almost Biedermeier painting on the surface. Portraits, friendship pictures, animals, landscapes, especially panoramas—a few chunks of mountain, horizon lines, water surfaces, sky, palm trees. He switches between figuration and abstraction with ease, between dreamlike scenarios and very concrete images."
 Sebastjan Brank. "Review: Frank Walter's Retrospective at the MMK: Caribbean landscapes that refuse to cater to colonial fever dreams". Arts of the Working Class, May 22, 2020. http://artsoftheworkingclass.org/text/review-frank-walters-retrospective-at-the-mmk
"Divesting themselves of grandeur, conventionally reserved for sceneries of the archipelago, Frank Walter's landscapes reject depictions of terra nullius. Instead, they imbue nature with a sense of ontological unease. The framing of paintings, a great part of which is devoted to the late artist's birthplace of Antigua, almost violently cuts the setting into seemingly trivial fragments, de-exoticing the mise en scène. Ominous, at points monstrous undertones intensify my first visit to the museum after months of self-isolation."
"Walter's artworks are reduced to an almost diagrammatic skeleton, capturing instability that ceases to be either climatic or spectacular. Eschewing the standards of a sustain-release dramatic structure, the instability is perennial, incessant, offering a window into brief instances in the life of someone whose very presence made him antagonistic to the realities of his (and our) times."
 Esther Attar-Machanek. "Frank Walter retrospective, MMK Frankfurt 2020". Esther Art Newsletter, May 20, 2020. http://www.estherartnewsletter.com/news-international
 "Exhibitions, Frank Walter A retrospective". C& American Latina, May 20, 2020. http://amlatina.contemporaryand.com/events/frank-walter-a-retrospective/
 "Museum MMK – Frank Walter. A retrospective". City Child: Stadtkind Frankfurt, May 19, 2020. https://www.stadtkindfrankfurt.de/museum-mmk-frank-walter/
 "Frank Walter's outsider art: A statement in Frankfurt". The BR Kultur Buhne, BR24, May 18, 2020. https://www.br.de/nachrichten/kultur/die-aussenseiterkunst-frank-walters-ein-statement-in-frankfurt,RzJw818
"This may be felt as an overload of Frank Walter's painting, which never addressed racist and political debate in his works. But at the same time one remembers a formulation by the curator Harald Szeemann, who once characterized certain forms of outsider art: "No idyll without catastrophe, no catastrophe without idyll". In any case, the catastrophic idyll of Frank Walter affects one. You surprised. It is worth getting to know each other."
 Gregor Quack. "Pictures of loneliness". Frankfurter Allgemeine Zeitung, May 17, 2020.
 Christian Huther. "Poet with color, form, and figure". Main Echo, May 17, 2020. 
 Rudolf Schmitz, Artist Frank Walter. "A struggle for identity formation". Ard Audiothek,May 15, 2020. https://www.ardaudiothek.de/fazit-kultur-vom-tage/maler-frank-walter-ein-kampf-um-identitaetsbildung/75671912
 Georg Imdahl. "Frank Walter Retrospective". Deutschlandfunk Radio, May 16, 2020. https://ondemand-mp3.dradio.de/file/dradio/2020/05/16/gesamtkunstwerk_die_retrospektive_auf_frank_walter_im_mmk_dlf_20200516_1732_f44ef31e.mp3
 Petra Kamman. "Frank Walter, A retrospective at the Museum for Modern Art (MMK)". Feuilleton Frankfurt, The Magazine for Art, Culture and Lifestyle, May 15, 2020. https://www.feuilletonfrankfurt.de/2020/05/15/frank-walter-eine-retrospektive-im-mmk/#more-98665
 Michael Hierholzer. "Caribbean Avant Garde: In search". Frankfurter Allgemeine Zeitung, May 15, 2020. https://www.faz.net/aktuell/rhein-main/frank-walter-retrospektive-im-mmk-frankfurt-16770520.html
"He is a son of western modernity" "A life as a total work of art: This is also reflected in his art, which unfolds an enormous wealth of perspectives in an almost romantic overview of all possible subjects and design elements."
 Sandra Danicke. "Frank Walter: What he saw he did not want to believe". Frankfurter Rundschau, May 15, 2020. https://www.fr.de/kultur/kunst/ausstellung-frank-walter-sah-wollte-nicht-glauben-13764864.html
"The mouth of a shark and three colored circles. A gray triangle on the left on the horizon. It is the first of an endless number of images in this retrospective by Frank Walter at the Frankfurt Museum of Modern Art. A simple composition and yet very sophisticated. Because it appears completely abstract in parts, figurative in others and because one is subordinate to the other. You can interpret the three circles as balls, the triangle as a mountain—and the flat image gets a considerable depth. Walter has mastered both forms of expression and much more. He was a man of many talents. One who designed cosmological-mathematical drawings of great dynamism and entangled microcosms with macrocosms in fascinating compositions. At the same time an accomplished landscape painter who condensed the intensity of a sultry evening or a shimmering afternoon in sometimes tiny paintings. Who could create worlds with which a handful of casually thrown brush strokes on thin wooden plates, cardboard disks or packaging backsides, in which one would like to sink."
"Although the artist was always aware of the quality of his work, it was not shown during his lifetime. A complete exhibition was stored in boxes at his home. It was only in 2017 that parts of his work could be seen at the Venice Biennale in the National Pavilion of Antigua and Barbuda. The curator, the American Barbara Paca, had known Walter herself."
 Ann Wente-Jaeger. "Frank Walter". Frizz: The Magazine for Frankfurt, Offenbach and Vordertaunus, May 15, 2020. https://frizz-frankfurt.de/Kultur/kunst/frank-walter-27-9-museum-mmk/
"His style is clear, reduced, often abstract and of a vibrating intensity."
 Catrin Lorch. "An educated citizen from Antigua and Barbuda". Suddeutsche Zeitung, May 15, 2020. https://www.sueddeutsche.de/kultur/retrospektive-des-kuenstlers-frank-walter-ein-bildungsbuerger-aus-antigua-und-barbuda-1.4908938
"It is not a matter of course that his relatives kept this legacy, protected it from hurricanes and insect feeding. But when two years ago Antigua & When Barbuda was represented for the first time with a pavilion at the Venice Biennale, the boxes and boxes were ready and had found their time, as in a message in a bottle."
"The kinship of the green overgrown horizon lines with romanticism and the proximity of his stenciled color fields to abstraction prove that he also painted himself into an art and cultural history. "The European world was my world, not because I forced myself to like or accept it; it was inherently my world. I couldn't do without it any more than I could have done without my limbs."
 Martina Conrad. "Large Retrospective of Frank Walter's work in Frankfurt: Art and Exhibitions". SWR2, Kultur neu entdecken, May 15, 2020. https://www.swr.de/swr2/kunst-und-ausstellung/spaeter-erfolg-retrospektive-des-werks-von-frank-walter-100.html
 Claus-Jurgen Gopfert. "The internet has nothing to do with the real experience of art". Frankfurt Rundschau, May 10, 2020. https://www.fr.de/frankfurt/internet-nichts-realen-erfahrung-kunst-tun-13757450.html
 Sandra Danicke. "King without a kingdom". Das Kunstmagazin, April 24, 2020.
 "MMK Museum of Modern Art Frankfurt: Frank Walter". Culture Guide Europe, March 17, 2020. https://cultureguide.eu/en/mmk-museum-fuer-moderne-kunst-frankfurt-frank-walter/
Nancy Durrant. "Edinburgh visual art review: Jacob's Ladder at Ingleby Gallery", The Times, August 11, 2018. https://www.thetimes.co.uk/article/edinburgh-visual-art-review-jacobs-ladder-at-ingleby-gallery-2nz3lnkn5
 Jerry Saltz. "Antiguan master Frank Walter is a revelation at ADAA". New York, March 2, 2018. https://www.vulture.com/2018/03/antiguan-master-frank-walter-is-a-revelation-at-adaa.html
 Sarah Douglas, "Editor-in-Chief of Art News and her top pick at Venice Biennale. An alternative perspective: What transcends the almighty market?" Modern Luxury, December 2017.
 Zoe Whitley. "Top picks for exhibitions". ArtForum International, vol. 56, no. 4, December 2, 2017.
 William Varley. "Tales from the Caribbean". Jackdaw, October 2017.
 Myra Robinson, "A corner of the Caribbean at the Biennale". La Gazzetta Italiana, October 2017. http://www.lagazzettaitaliana.com/travel/8587-a-corner-of-the-caribbean-at-the-biennale
"Astonishing exhibition ... The whole show has been expertly curated by Barbara Paca, cultural envoy to Antigua and Barbuda. She has found apt quotations to accompany the work and provides even more information if you are lucky enough to meet her at the show."
 Rachel Campbell-Johnston, "Exhibition review: Frank Walter: Flamboyant Trees". The Times, July 14, 2017. https://www.thetimes.co.uk/article/exhibition-review-frank-walter-flamboyant-trees-66vmtbzks
 "Art Trip: Venice Biennale". PBS Digital Studios, May 12, 2017. https://www.pbs.org/video/art-trip-venice-biennale-t1aztr/
"Tucked away in the recesses of a former 15th-century monastery, this is a thorough, thoughtful and captivating show at the Biennale."
 Myra Robinson, "A corner of the Caribbean at the Biennale". Italy Magazine, September 5, 2017. http://www.italymagazine.com/featured-story/corner-caribbean-biennale
 "Mid-Shore Art News: Notes from Venice". The Talbot Spy, August 17, 2017. http://talbotspy.org/mid-shore-art-notes-notes-from-venice/
 Scott Indrisek. "When is an artist's mental health your business?" Artsy, July 31, 2017. https://www.artsy.net/article/artsy-editorial-artists-mental-health-business
"The Pavilion, and its hefty accompanying catalogue, is a fascinating case study regarding the choices curators can make in dealing with complicated artists. In [Valerie] Rousseau's reckoning, the Pavilion organizers 'really dig into all the possible biographical facts they could.', 'I think the tone was right ... I think it was a point of view that was risky.
 "Review of the Frank Walter exhibition at La Biennale di Venezia". Gondola Days, June 2017, Lineadacqua, Venice. http://gondoladays.it
 Thelma Golden, Director and Chief Curator, Studio Museum, NY. "Venice Biennale: triumphs and talking points". Art Newspaper, June 12, 2017. http://theartnewspaper.com/reports/venice-triumphs-and-talking-points/
 Barbara Paca. "Frank Walter: The Last Universal Man". In-Time Magazine, May 2017, Venice. http://intimemagazine.com/frank-walter-the-last-universal-man/
 "Charlotte Edwards. "Review of Antigua and Barbuda's inaugural National Pavilion and the Antiguan garden created for the La Biennale di Venezia". World of Interiors, May 2017. http://www.worldofinteriors.co.uk
 La Biennale Di Venezia #57, Official Catalogue National Pavilions, May 2017. http://www.labiennale.org/en
 My Art Guide, May 2017, Venice. https://myartguides.com/national-participations/venice/antigua-and-barbuda-2017/
 Christoph Amend. "Interview with Serpentine Gallery Artistic Director Hans-Ulrich Obrist". Weltkunst, May 30, 2017. https://www.weltkunst.de/blog/2017/05/was-haben-sie-gehehen-herr-obrist
 Niko Kos Earle. "An overview of the national pavilions at the 2017 Venice Biennale". Art Bastion, May 28, 2017.
"If there is one National Pavilion you must not miss it is the first Antigua and Barbuda Pavilion ... The exhibition begins with an encounter between beautiful minds at that crucial moment when one was on the brink of disappearing ... This exhibition invites visitors to inhabit the creative world and discover the humanist vision of this now seminal Caribbean artist." 
 Jason Farago. "Powerful pavilions at the Venice Biennale". Australian Financial Review, May 23, 2017. http://www.afr.com/lifestyle/powerful-pavilions-and-other-picks-at-the-venice-biennale-20170521-gw9vcy
 Dr. Caitlin Hoffman. "Perceptions of creative genius: Impetus for innovation and collaboration". New York Hospital, Weill Cornell Brain and Spine Center, May 22, 2017. http://weillcornellbrainandspine.org/perceptions-creative-genius-impetus-innovation-and-collaboration
"The link between an Antiguan painter and a New York neurosurgeon seems unlikely at best, but life does have a way of making some rather extraordinary connections. Dr. Paca sought not only to expose his art, but also to explore his mind through recordings of their conversations and investigation of a several thousand-page long manifesto." 
 Holland Cotter. "Venice Biennale: Whose reflection do you see?" The New York Times, May 22, 2017. 
"Some of the better national presentations are tucked away in palazzos, churches, and gardens across town. They can be hard to find—but some are worth the hunt. That's true of a selection of paintings by the Caribbean artist Frank Walter at the Antigua and Barbuda Pavilion." 
 M. Neelika Jayawardane. "Black presences at the Venice Biennale". Al Jazeera, May 20, 2017.
Kunst Kritikk [Denmark], May 19, 2017. http://www.kunstkritikk.no/kritikk/privilegerte-og-uprivilegerte-paviljonger/
"The work of Antigua and Barbuda's National Pavilion and artist Frank Walter reflects a life with a simple elegance in the artist's work—a clarity which is lacking in many other presentations at the Biennale."
 Ben Davis. "The good, the bad, and the ... Huh? Ranking the Venice Biennale's standout moments". Artnet News, May 17, 2017.
"Best Rediscovery—I gotta give credit to ARTnews scribe Andrew Russeth, who always seems to somehow see everything, for recommending that we go check out the Antigua and Barbuda pavilion. I'm glad I did. "Frank Walter: The Last Universal Man 1926-2009" happens to be the first ever outing in Venice for the Caribbean commonwealth, and also happens to be great: An illuminating, scholarly look at the life and art of a figure who has been compared to Adolf Wolfli and Henry Darger, but who has a story too riveting and singular to butcher by abbreviating it here. Just go take a look."
 Jason Fargo. "Caribbean Splendor 'Most eye-Opening' is Frank Walter". The New York Times, May 14, 2017. https://www.nytimes.com/2017/05/14/arts/design/venice-notebook-a-feast-at-the-biennale-and-beyond.html
"Of the 85 national pavilions, five are presented by countries participating in the Biennale for the first time. The most eye-opening is the pavilion of Antigua and Barbuda ... his paintings—of Antiguan flora, the insignia of European nobility, or small abstractions of stars and circles that recall the Pop Art of Robert Indiana—open onto a world much larger than that small dwelling."
 Andrew Russeth. "One last batch of photos from around the 2017 Venice Biennale, from the new VAC Foundation to a Sterling Lucy McKenzie Show". Art News, May 13, 2017.
"The Biennale is officially open. Don't miss the remarkable Frank Walter retrospective in Antigua & Barbuda's inaugural National Pavilion."
 Jacqueline Ceresoli. "Antigua e per la prima volta in Europa, espone Frank Walter: Un visionario pittore e scrittore autoproclamatosi settimo Principe delle Indie Occidentali". Exibart, May 12, 2017.
 Scott Indrisek. "The unknown Antiguan visionary who knew he was 'The most important living artist., Artsy, May 11, 2017. 
"This is a reverential, comprehensive look at a multi-hyphenate autodidact who, Paca says, earned his reputation as the 'John Nash of Antigua'."
 "The work of late Antiguan artist to feature in major Italy exhibition". Antigua News Room, May 10, 2017. 
 Alexxa Gotthardt. "From Kiribati to Nigeria, Five new countries at the Venice Biennale". Artsy, May 3, 2017. https://www.artsy.net/article/artsy-editorial-kiribati-nigeria-5-new-countries-venice-biennale
"A nation of just over 91,000 people, Antigua & Barbuda is mounting an ambitious exhibition celebrating the life of the late artist and poet Frank Walter, who passed away in 2009. "The Last Universal Man 1926-2009" provides a deep look into the artist's mind through a selection of his works, which span 5,000 pieces of art and 25,000 pages of archival material. The first person of color to run a sugar plantation in Antigua, Walter descended from both slaves and slave owners, and struggled to reconcile these distinct parts of his identity, ultimately channeling exploration of his past and present into an imaginative world of philosophy, poetry, art, and music."
 Tamara Chalabi and Paolo Colombo. "The Venice questionnaire #9". Art Review, April 12, 2017. 
 La Rocco, Ben. "Outsider Art: Window to the soul". Hyperallergic, January 27, 2017. 
 Roberta Smith. "Outsider Art 2017: A top ten". The New York Times, January 19, 2017. https://www.nytimes.com/2017/01/19/arts/design/outsider-art-2017-a-top-10.html
 Krasny, Jill. "The Lord of Follies is finally getting his due". 1st Dibs, January 25, 2016. https://www.1stdibs.com/introspective-magazine/frank-walter/
 Mark Sadler. "Frank Walter". frieze, June–August 2015. https://frieze.com/article/frank-walter
 Giles Sutherland. "Colourful naivety masks a sophisticated outsider". The Times, Scottish Edition, April 4, 2015. https://www.thetimes.co.uk/article/frank-walter-at-ingleby-gallery-edinburgh-l6sb0fh99wz 
K. Sundberg. "Discover the under-appreciated brilliance of late Antiguan artist Frank Walter". Artsy Editorial, April 2, 2015. https://www.artsy.net/article/artsy-editorial-discover-the-under-appreciated-brilliance-of-late-antiguan
 Robert Clark, Skye Sherwin. "Christina Mackie, Los Carpinteros, Frank Walter: This week's new exhibitions". The Guardian, March 28, 2015. https://www.theguardian.com/artanddesign/2015/mar/28/this-weeks-new-exhibitions
 Melanie Pococke. "Review: Art Basel Hong Kong". Art Agenda, May 15, 2014. https://www.art-agenda.com/features/235907/art-basel-hong-kong
"All out installation Miami Art Basel". Sotheby's News, 2013. http://www.sothebys.com/en/news-video/blogs/all-blogs/art-fair-insider/2013/12/all-out-installation-miami-art-basel.html
 Kelly Crow. "In Miami, crowds and confidence". The Wall Street Journal, December 5, 2013. https://www.wsj.com/articles/in-miami-crowds-and-confidence-1386291514
 "Ingleby Gallery presents Antiguan artist Frank Walter at Art Basel Miami Beach" ARC Magazine. October 1, 2013. http://arcthemagazine.com/arc/2013/10/ingleby-gallery-presents-antiguan-artist-frank-walter-at-art-basel-miami-beach/
 Stuart Kelly. "A question of identity: The case of a Caribbean painter who was convinced he was Scottish raises important questions about the effect of colonial oppression on both the conquered and the conqueror", Scottish Field, June 2013, pp. 72–76.
 Louisa Buck, "Art Basel Miami Beach: Let the bright lights shine". London Telegraph, June 12, 2013. 
 "The secret stories that works of art can tell". The Art Newspaper, March 26, 2013. http://www.theartnewspaper.com/articles/The-secret-stories-that-works-of-art-can-tell/31326
 "Songs of Innocence and Experience". The List, February–April 2013. http://www.inglebygallery.com/wp-content/uploads/2013/08/songs_selected_press.pdf
 Duncan MacMillan. "Visual art". The Scotsman, February 28, 2013. 
 "Songs of Innocence and Experience". The Guardian, February 9, 2013. 
 Malcolm Jack. Homecoming' for Tropical Visionary: Exhibition to show work of Antiguan artist inspired by Scots landscape". Scotland on Sunday, February 3, 2013.
 Barbara Paca. "Last Universal Man". Raw Vision, Spring/Summer 2012. https://rawvision.com/articles/frank-walter-last-universal-man

References

Caribbean artists
Male painters
1926 births
2009 deaths